In algebra, a free presentation of a module M over a commutative ring R is an exact sequence of R-modules:

Note the image under g of the standard basis generates M. In particular, if J is finite, then M is a finitely generated module. If I and J are finite sets, then the presentation is called a finite presentation; a module is called finitely presented if it admits a finite presentation.

Since f is a module homomorphism between free modules, it can be visualized as an (infinite) matrix with entries in R and M as its cokernel.

A free presentation always exists: any module is a quotient of a free module: , but then the kernel of g is again a quotient of a free module: . The combination of f and g is a free presentation of M. Now, one can obviously keep "resolving" the kernels in this fashion; the result is called a free resolution. Thus, a free presentation is the early part of the free resolution.

A presentation is useful for computation. For example, since tensoring is right-exact, tensoring the above presentation with a module, say N, gives:

 

If N is an R-algebra, then this is the presentation of the N-module ; that is, the presentation extends under base extension.

For left-exact functors, there is for example

Proof: Applying F to a finite presentation  results in

and the same for G. Now apply the snake lemma.

See also 
Coherent module
Finitely related module
Fitting ideal
Quasi-coherent sheaf

References 
 Eisenbud, David, Commutative Algebra with a View Toward Algebraic Geometry, Graduate Texts in Mathematics, 150, Springer-Verlag, 1995, .

Algebra